WorldTeach was founded in 1986 by a group of Harvard University students, including prize-winning economist Michael Kremer. It is a non-governmental organization that provided opportunities for individuals to live and work as volunteer teachers in developing countries. Approximately 300 volunteers were annually placed in year-long and summer programs, with more than 7,500 placed.

In April 2019, WorldTeach ceased its volunteer operations to continue exploring how best it could champion its work in serving the global community with education.

Programs 
All volunteers for year-long programs must be enrolled in or have completed four year college programs, with most volunteers being recent graduates.

Most volunteers teach the English language, and some teach information technology, mathematics, science, accounting, and HIV/AIDS education. Typically WorldTeach partners with Ministries of Education, who identify the needs that WorldTeach volunteers can help them address.

Volunteer placements vary widely in the size of the community (300 people to 7 million), age of the students (elementary to adult), and living situation (homestay or apartment). Like the Peace Corps, volunteers may go to a wide range of countries, and WorldTeach volunteers apply to and are accepted to particular country placements.
 WorldTeach currently has year-long programs in American Samoa, Ecuador, the Marshall Islands, Namibia, Thailand, and Vietnam.

For year-long programs, which require a four-year college degree, costs are shared between the hosting educational organization and WorldTeach volunteers. Included are housing placements, visa sponsorship, health and emergency evacuation insurance, 24-hour field staff support, three-four weeks of in-country orientation (including language and teacher training) and a monthly stipend roughly equal to a local teacher's salary.

Summer programs are in Ecuador, India, Morocco, Namibia, and South Africa. Volunteers need not have a college degree, although most are current college students. These programs are not funded by WorldTeach's in-country partners and students usually pay for them through scholarships, out-of-pocket, or obtain college credit.

In April 2019, WorldTeach's board of directors voted to cease in-country programs, a model which proved to be unsustainable given the scale, cost structure, and the current market.

References

External links
 WorldTeach website
 WorldTeach reviews at GoOverseas.com

Educational organizations based in the United States
Educational institutions established in 1986
1986 establishments in Massachusetts